Ishaaq Ahmad Farhan, born in Ein Kerem, Palestine (19346 July 2018) was a Jordanian politician and educator of Palestinian origin, studied chemistry at the American University of Beirut he then went on to pursue a Ph.D. in the Education of Science from Columbia University and he spoke two languages Arabic and English. Moreover, Ishaaq was a politician, thinker, teacher, and educator, so he was one of the leaders of the Islamic Action Front. Also, he was a key figure of the Jordanian advisory council and Ishaaq was a believer in the direction of Wasfi Al-Tal, so he entered the government of Wasfi Al-Tal in 1970 then he broke away from the Islamic movement during while holding the position of Minister of Education and Islamic Endowments in 1973, where he supervised the formulation of educational curricula of the government of Ahmed Al-Lozi. In addition, he was the President of the Jordanian Scientific Association, and he was the president of the University of Jordan. Also, he strongly came back to manage the Islamic movement receiving the secretariat of the Islamic Action Front. Moreover, he was a member of the Jordanian House of Senates from 1989-1993 and he became head of the Zarqa Private University from 1994 to 2007. Furthermore, his meeting on Al Jazeera's "Bala Hadood" (Without Borders) television program showed the effect of changing curriculum on the identity in mother tongue education, 18 February 2004, and he also showed the Nakba memory and lack of empathy with the Israeli-Palestinian conflict on May 16, 2001 .

References

American University of Beirut alumni
Government ministers of Jordan
2018 deaths
Columbia University alumni
1934 births
Jordanian people of Palestinian descent